Talgat Ilyasov ( born 25 February 1981) is a Kazakh-Australian  wrestler. He competed in the men's 74 kilogram freestyle wrestling competition at the 2016 Summer Olympics.

Ilyasov holds the position of President of Wrestling Australia.

Mixed martial arts record

|-
| Win
|align=center| 1–0
| Amin Yaqubi
| Submission (arm triangle choke)
|Australian Fighting Championship 10
|
|align=center|2
|align=center|1:36
|Melbourne, Australia
|}

References

External links
 

1981 births
Living people
People from Samarkand
Australian male sport wrestlers
Olympic wrestlers of Australia
Wrestlers at the 2016 Summer Olympics
Place of birth missing (living people)
Australian male mixed martial artists
Mixed martial artists utilizing freestyle wrestling
Uzbekistani emigrants to Australia